Charles Stewart Desmond (December 2, 1896 – February 9, 1987), was an American lawyer and politician from New York. He was Chief Judge of the New York Court of Appeals from 1960 to 1966.

Life
Desmond was born and died in Buffalo, New York.  He was the son of Patrick Desmond and Katherine (Jordan) Desmond. He graduated A.B. and M.A. from Canisius College.

During World War I, he served as a second lieutenant in the United States Marine Corps Aviation. However, he caught influenza during training and did not get overseas before the Armistice.

In 1920, he graduated LL.B. from University at Buffalo Law School.

He married Helen Ryan (d. 1958) and they had four children: Charles Ryan, Sheila (Landon), Kathleen (Hughes) and Patricia (Williams).

In January 1940, he was appointed by Governor Herbert H. Lehman a justice of the New York Supreme Court to fill a vacancy.

In November 1940, he was elected on the Democratic and American Labor tickets a judge of the New York Court of Appeals, and re-elected in 1954 on the Democratic, Republican and Liberal tickets. In 1959, he was elected unopposed Chief Judge. He retired from the bench at the end of 1966 when he reached the constitutional age limit of 70 years.

Afterwards he lived at his farm in Eden, New York, resumed his private practice and taught at the University at Buffalo Law School. He died at the Mercy Hospital in Buffalo.

See also

References
 Political Graveyard (giving wrong death date)
 Obit in NYT on February 11, 1987

1896 births
1987 deaths
Politicians from Buffalo, New York
Chief Judges of the New York Court of Appeals
United States Marine Corps officers
Canisius College alumni
New York Supreme Court Justices
University at Buffalo Law School alumni
People from Eden, New York
20th-century American judges
Lawyers from Buffalo, New York
20th-century American lawyers